Armenia participated in the 2000 Summer Paralympics in Sydney.

Medalists

Events

Sailing
 Stasik Nazaryan, Mher Avanesyan and Garush Danielyan (team)

See also
2000 Summer Paralympics
Armenia at the 2000 Summer Olympics

External links
International Paralympic Committee

References 

2000
Nations at the 2000 Summer Paralympics
Paralympics